Donald Johnson and Piet Norval were the defending champions but did not compete that year.

Ellis Ferreira and Rick Leach won in the final 7–6(7–3), 6–4 against Mahesh Bhupathi and Leander Paes.

Seeds
Champion seeds are indicated in bold text while text in italics indicates the round in which those seeds were eliminated.

  Daniel Nestor /  Nenad Zimonjić (semifinals)
  Petr Pála /  Pavel Vízner (first round)
  Mahesh Bhupathi /  Leander Paes (final)
  Lucas Arnold /  Michael Hill (first round)

Draw

External links
 2001 Davidoff Swiss Indoors Doubles Draw

2001 ATP Tour
2001 Davidoff Swiss Indoors